Jean-François Leduc is a Canadian film director from Montreal, Quebec. He has worked on various Canadian films but is mostly known for producing and directing Die Alive in 2001, a low-budget feature film which obtained a Guinness World Record as "Least Expensive Feature Film".

In 2009, with the help and encouragements of Roger Corman, he co-founded Montreal Film Studio and is currently acting as its principal producer. Montreal Film Studio is best known for its "Fantastic Movie Trailers" DVD series.

References

External links

1972 births
Living people
Film producers from Quebec
Film directors from Montreal
French Quebecers